Christian Bornemann (* 22 October 1965 in Dortmund) is a German Windsurfer. He held 2014–2018 the German speed record over 500-meter, and since 2018 the German speed record over the nautical mile (1852 meter) and is one of the twenty fastest windsurfers in the world.

Life 

Bornemann grew up in Dortmund and learned to surf at the age of 14. At the age of 13 he came for the first time in contact with windsurfing. He completed his first professional race at the age of 30.
He currently lives in Dortmund and works as a dentist.

Achievements (excerpt) 

2018
 German record with 38.94 knots/Nautical mile (1852 m)

2015
 Award: Dortmunds Sportler des Jahres
 German record with 50.20 knots/500 meters
 German „GPS" record with 51.05 knots/10 seconds

2014
 German record with 48.82 knots/500 meters
 German „GPS" record with 49.49 knots/10 seconds
 5th place of the „GPS worldranking"
2012
 German record with 46.75 knots/500 meters
 German „GPS" record with 47.70 knots/10 seconds
 7th place „Surfer of the Year"
2009
 4th place of the Speed-Worldranking
2005
 3rd place ISA/IFCA World Production Board Speed World Championship overall

References 

1965 births
Living people
German windsurfers
Sportspeople from Dortmund